Neurostrota brunnea is a moth of the family Gracillariidae. It is known from the Galápagos Islands.

The larvae probably feed on a Coffea species. They probably mine the leaves of their host plant.

References

Gracillariinae
Moths described in 2006